"Told You So" is a song by Scottish singer Nathan Evans. Following on from "Wellerman", two versions of the song, including a remix by English songwriter and producer Digital Farm Animals, were released for digital download and streaming by Polydor and UMG on 25 June 2021, alongside accompanying music videos.

Track listings

Music video
The accompanying official video was directed by Michael Baldwin and was released on 25 June 2021, along with the release of the song. In the official video, Evans appears in Seaford, East Sussex, Newhaven, Edinburgh, Brighton, Haywards Heath, Crawley, City of London, West Wickham and Crystal Palace, London.

Credits and personnel
 Buzz Killer – producer, bass, drum programming, guitar, mandolin, background vocalist
 Digital Farm Animals – producer, studio personnel, remixer, associated performer, music production
 Nathan Evans – associated performer, vocals, background vocalist, composer lyricist
 Alan Jukes – associated performer, background vocalist, composer lyricist
 Luke Taylor – associated performer, background vocalist
 Stephen Jukes – associated performer, background vocalist, composer lyricist
 Jamie McGrory – studio personnel
 Geoff Swan – studio personnel, mixer
 Niko Battistini – studio personnel, assistant mixer
 Mike Hillier – studio personnel, mastering engineer
 Ross Hamilton – composer lyricist
 Nick Gale – associated performer, bass, mandolin, composer lyricist

Charts

Release history

References

External links
 

2021 songs
2021 singles
Digital Farm Animals songs
Songs written by Digital Farm Animals
Song recordings produced by Digital Farm Animals
Polydor Records singles
Universal Music Group singles